Rojo means "red" in Spanish. Rojo may also refer to:

Rojo (surname)

Music
 Rojo (band), a Mexican Christian rock band
 Rojo (Rojo album), 2001
 Rojo (Red Garland album), 1961
 "Rojo", a song by J Balvin from Colores, 2020
 "Rojo", album by Río Roma from 2020

Other
 Rojo (film), a film which won the 2018 Silver Shell for Best Director
 Rojo (TV series), a Chilean reality television competition series
 Rojo.com, a web based news aggregator
 Rojo, a recurring villain in the Ben 10 franchise
 Ron Johnson (born 1955), American politician